Namutumba District, sometimes referred to as Busiki District is a district in Eastern Uganda. It is named after its 'chief town', Namutumba, where the district headquarters are located.

Location
Namutumba District is bordered by Pallisa District to the north, Kibuku District to the northeast, Butaleja District to the southeast, Bugiri District to the south, Iganga District to the southwest and Kaliro District to the northwest. The coordinates of the district are:00 51N, 33 41E.

Overview
Namutumba District was created by Act of the Ugandan Parliament in 2005 and became operational on 1 July 2006. Prior to that the district was part of Iganga District and was known as Busiki County. Namutumba District is part of Busoga sub-region. The districts that constitute the sub-region include the following: 1. Bugiri District 2. Buyende District 3. Bugweri District 4. Iganga District 5. Jinja District 6. Kaliro District 7. Kamuli District 8. Luuka District 9. Mayuge District 10. Namayingo District and 11. Namutumba District

According to the 2002 national census, the Busoga sub-region was home to an estimated 2.5 million people at that time. Namutumba District is divided into the following sub-counties and one town council:

Population
In 1991, the national population census estimated the district population at about 123,900. The national census in 2002 estimated the population of the district at about 167,700. The annual population growth rate in the district was calculated at 2.7%. It is estimated that the population of Namutumba District in 2012 was approximately 218,900.

Economic activities
Subsistence agriculture and animal husbandry are the two main economic activities in the district.

See also
 Namutumba
 Busoga sub-region
 Districts of Uganda

References

External links
 Half of Namutumba Children Malnourished

 
Districts of Uganda
Eastern Region, Uganda
Lake Kyoga